Andé is a town in east-central Ivory Coast. It is a sub-prefecture of Bongouanou Department in Moronou Region, Lacs District.

Andé was a commune until March 2012, when it became one of 1126 communes nationwide that were abolished.

In 2014, the population of the sub-prefecture of Andé was 51,726.

Villages
The 11 villages of the sub-prefecture of Andé and their population in 2014 are:

References

Sub-prefectures of Moronou Region
Former communes of Ivory Coast